The 2008–09 Heineken Cup was the fourteenth edition of the Heineken Cup, the annual rugby union European club competition for clubs from the top six nations in European rugby. It started in October 2008 and ended on 23 May 2009 at Murrayfield Stadium in Edinburgh. Irish side Leinster became the champions, defeating Leicester Tigers 19–16 in the final.

Teams
Seven French teams competed, as a French team, Toulouse, progressed further in the previous year's tournament than any English or Italian team.

Four Welsh teams competed, as Italy forfeited its place in the Italo-Celtic playoff and a Welsh team were the highest-placed team in the previous year's Celtic league not to qualify otherwise. Other nations had their usual number of participants: England six, Ireland three, Italy two and Scotland two.

Seeding
The seeding system for participating teams changed from previous editions of the Heineken Cup. Previously, each participating nation would seed one of their teams and these six teams would be drawn in different groups at the group stage. Starting with the 2008–09 edition, the 24 competing teams were ranked based on past Heineken Cup and European Challenge Cup performance, with each group receiving one team from each quartile, or Tier. The requirement to have only one team per country in each group however, still applied (with the exception of the inclusion of the seventh French team).

The brackets show each team's European Rugby Club Ranking before the start of the 2008–09 season.

Pool stage

The draw for the pool stages took place on 17 June 2008 in Dublin.

{| class="wikitable"
|+ Key to colours
|-
| bgcolor="#ccffcc" |     
| Winner of each pool, and two best runners-up,advance to quarterfinals. Seed # in parentheses
|}

Pool 1

Pool 2

Pool 3

Pool 4

Pool 5

Pool 6

Seeding and runners-up

Knockout stage
The draw for the quarter-finals took place on 27 January at Murrayfield Stadium.

Quarter-finals

 This match became notorious for the "Bloodgate" scandal. Quins coach Dean Richards was banned from rugby for three years for his role in faking an injury to wing Tom Williams so that Quins could send in a blood replacement. Williams himself was initially banned for a year, but after he revealed the full extent of the scheme, the ban was reduced to four months.

Semi-finals

Final

Notes and references

 
Heineken Cup seasons
Heineken
Heineken
Heineken
Heineken
Heineken
Heineken